The Hoq Cave or Hawk Cave is a limestone cave on the island of Socotra, Yemen. It is located in the Hala spot approximately 1.5 km from the north-eastern coast facing the open sea to north-east. Clearly visible from the sea, but of difficult access, it is situated in an altitude of 350 m. The about 2 km deep cave has a main passage with a mean width of 50 m and a mean height of 20 m. 200 m from the entrance is the limite d’éclairement. The temperature is constant during the year and varies between 25 and 27 °C with a humidity higher than 95%.

All sorts of speleothems, where numerous endemic troglobionts are living, can be found along the way into the cave.

A range of epigraphy from the 1st to the 6th century A.D. has been recorded in the back part of the cave placing Socotra as a major hub in the overseas trading links in ancient times where merchants from all coasts of the northern Indian Ocean were brought together.

Protection
The cave is a protected area under the law. To conserve the cave a pathway has been constructed. The end of the cave is still under study for future archaeological investigations.

Description
In 2001 a group of Belgian speleologists from the "Socotra Karst Project" mapped and investigated the cave finding numerous graffitis and drawings on speleothems and floors. Subsequent research concluded that they were the work of navigators or merchants who visited the island at the beginning of the first millennium. The corpus of inscriptions is in Indian Brahmi, South Arabic, Ethiopian Geʽez, Ancient Greek, Palmyrene, and Bactrian scripts. All the inscriptions are rather short containing personal names, hometowns, professions, or ethnic and religious affiliations.

Gallery of speleothems

See also
 Tablet De Geest
 History of Socotra

References

Caves of Socotra
Buddhist caves
Rock art of Socotra